The Chicago and Eastern Illinois Railroad  was a Class I railroad that linked Chicago to southern Illinois, St. Louis, and Evansville. Founded in 1877, it grew aggressively and stayed relatively strong throughout the Great Depression and two World Wars before finally being purchased by the Missouri Pacific Railroad (MP or MoPac) and the Louisville and Nashville Railroad (L&N). Missouri Pacific merged with the C&EI corporate entity in 1976, and was later acquired itself by the Union Pacific Railroad.

History
The Chicago and Eastern Illinois Railroad was organized in 1877 as a consolidation of three others: the Chicago, Danville and Vincennes Railroad (Chicago-Danville, November 1871), the Evansville, Terre Haute and Chicago Railroad (Danville-Terre Haute, October 1871) and the Evansville and Terre Haute Railroad (Terre Haute-Evansville, November 1854).  Intended to merge or purchase railroads that had built lines between the southern suburbs of Chicago and Terre Haute, Indiana through Danville, Illinois, the C&EI constructed a new line from Chicago to a Mississippi River connection in extreme southern Illinois at Thebes.

The management of the Chicago and Eastern Illinois and the Chicago and Indiana Coal Railway ("the Coal Road" or C&IC) became intertwined and eventually a connection was built between the two railroads between Goodland, Indiana (on the C&IC) and Momence (on the C&EI). By 1894 the Eastern had merged the C&IC. The C&EI continued this vigorous growth into the next decade.

In 1902, the Frisco purchased a controlling interest in the Chicago and Eastern Illinois and continued building; first a connection between the two railroads at Pana, Illinois, next extending the line in Indiana to Evansville and a connection with the Ohio River. However, in 1913 financial problems led to the collapse of the Frisco, and the Eastern was once again on its own by 1920. The C&EI spun off a variety of their lines, including the "Coal Road" (which became the Chicago, Attica and Southern Railroad). The C&EI did not survive the Great Depression intact, entering bankruptcy in 1933, re-emerging just before World War II in 1940. The railroad continued its brisk growth once again, gaining access to St. Louis, Missouri in 1954.

The Missouri Pacific Railroad began to quietly purchase C&EI stock in 1961.  After approval was gained from the Interstate Commerce Commission, Mopac assumed control of the C&EI in May 1967.  One of the stipulations of the merger required sale of C&EI's Evansville line to the Louisville and Nashville Railroad in 1969. The line directly south of Chicago to near Danville was actually purchased by both railroads (and continues to be owned and operated jointly by MoPac and L&N's successors, Union Pacific Railroad and CSX Transportation).  The C&EI was maintained as a separate subsidiary for a few years, but Missouri Pacific merged it in 1976. The route from Woodland Junction, Illinois through Danville into Indiana became part of L&N and its successors (now CSX), while the western fork toward Thebes and St. Louis became MoPac/UP.

The Chicago terminal for the C&EI passenger trains was Dearborn Station, sometimes known as 'Polk Station.' LaSalle Street Station was used during Frisco control of the railroad.

The C&EI operated many streamliners. Its own trains, the Chicago to Cypress Meadowlark, and the Chicago to Evansville Whippoorwill were short lived.  The C&EI ran the Chicago to Evansville portion of the L&N's Humming Bird, and Georgian. The railroad also participated in the Chicago to Florida passenger service on the "Dixie Route", with trains such as the Dixie Limited, the Dixie Flyer, the Dixie Mail, the Dixie Flagler, and the Dixiana. It handled the trains from Chicago to Evansville, which then passed to the Louisville and Nashville, Nashville, Chattanooga and St. Louis, Central of Georgia, Atlantic Coast Line and Florida East Coast. In 1968 the C&EI terminated its Chicago to Evansville passenger operations, resulting in the loss of the Chicago leg of the remaining trains among those mentioned above, the Georgian and the Humming Bird. The Georgian was discontinued as a named train at this point. The C&EI's sole remaining train was the two and a half hour Chicago - Danville, Illinois Danville-Chicago Flyer.

Miles of road operated at year end: 945 in 1925, 863 in 1967, 643 in 1970 after L&N took over its piece. Track-miles operated: 1928 in 1925, 1435 in 1967, 1067 in 1970. In 1967 it reported 3173 million ton-miles of revenue freight and 41 million passenger-miles.

References

Bibliography

External links

Chicago & Eastern Illinois Railroad Historical Society (includes predecessor roads)
 Chicago & Eastern Illinois Railroad photos
A Brief History of the Chicago and Eastern Illinois Railroad
Chicago and Eastern Illinois Railroad System Map
1953 Chicago and Eastern Illinois timetable
Chicago and Eastern Illinois Railroad Company Records at the Newberry Library

 
Railway companies established in 1877
Railway companies disestablished in 1921
Railway companies established in 1940
Railway companies disestablished in 1976
Predecessors of the Missouri Pacific Railroad
Defunct Illinois railroads
Defunct Indiana railroads
Defunct Missouri railroads
Railroads in the Chicago metropolitan area
Former Class I railroads in the United States
American companies established in 1940
1877 establishments in Illinois